Tyuryushlya (Türeşle) is a rural locality (a selo) and the administrative centre of Tyuryushlinsky Selsoviet, Sterlitamaksky District, Bashkortostan, Russia. The population was 917 as of 2010. There are 6 streets.

Geography 
Tyuryushlya is located 38 km southwest of Sterlitamak (the district's administrative centre) by road. Yuzhny is the nearest rural locality.

References 

Rural localities in Sterlitamaksky District